Fredia "The Cheetah" Gibbs (born July 8, 1963), is an American former professional martial artist, kickboxer, and boxer who competed from 1975 to 2005. During her kickboxing career, she held ISKA, WKA, and WKF World Titles. Before her kickboxing career she was an All-American in basketball and track.

Gibbs made history when she became the first African-American female Kickboxing ISKA World Champion. She earned the name "The Most Dangerous Woman in the World" after an upset in 1994 in her fight against World Champion Valérie Wiet-Henin of France in the "Battle of the Masters" Pay Per View Event in San Jose, California. She went on to become one of the most dominant champions of all time, and remains a significant historical figure in light and super lightweight kickboxing divisions. She competed from 1991 to 1997, amassing a record of 16 wins, 0 losses, and 15 KOs, and three world titles. She also competed as a top contender in women's professional boxing from 1997 to 2005 with a record of 9 wins, 2 losses, and 1 draw.

She wrote The Fredia Gibbs Story about her life in 2016.

Early years
Fredia Gibbs was born in Chester, Pennsylvania. She was given the nickname "The Cheetah" at school due to her performance in track. Chester High School named their track team "Chester's Cheetahs" after Gibbs.

After high school, Gibbs attended Temple University in Philadelphia where she was the recipient of two athletic scholarships in basketball and track. She attended Cabrini University on a basketball scholarship, and majored in marketing. She was invited to the United States Olympic Training Center in Colorado Springs to try out for the women's United States women's national basketball team but was cut during the second tryouts. Gibbs was selected Kodak All American for three consecutive years for basketball at Cabrini University. She later went on to play professional basketball in Germany, averaging almost 30 points, 15 rebounds, and 10 assists a season.

Karate career
Gibbs began her instruction in Jeet Kune Do/Aikido fight style at Quiet Storm Martial Arts School in Chester, Pennsylvania. She learned martial arts to rebuild her self confidence and self esteem, which suffered as a result of being bullied. She was trained by a group of lethal martial artists, lawyers, judges, doctors, business leaders, and blue collar workers. She continued to train and compete under Quiet Storm throughout high school and college, and she won three world championships in Tae Kwon Do by the time she graduated from Cabrini, with the last World Championship won in St. Petersburg, Florida, against an undefeated champion from Puerto Rico. Throughout these years, she competed and became a World Champion in martial arts while simultaneously excelling as an All-American in basketball and track.

Basketball career
From the age of 12 until 1988, Gibbs competed in basketball. She was credited with turning a winless program at Chester High School into a Division Champion, District Champion, and State Semi-finalist while earning All-County, All-State, and All-American honors. She averaged 28 points, 5 rebounds, and 10 assists in her senior year. In 1981, she received dual scholarships in basketball and track to Temple University. After competing at Temple for one season, she lost her scholarship in 1982 due to academics and withdrew.

After completing her collegiate basketball career at Cabrini, Gibbs was hired to play professional basketball for Team Etzella in Luxembourg in the European Women's Professional Basketball League. She led Etzella to its first European Cup while leading the team in scoring and rebounding.

Muay Thai kickboxing career
In 1990, after moving to North Hollywood, California, Gibbs took up kickboxing at the Benny Urquidez's The Jet Kickboxing Training Center under the instruction of Rubin Urquidez and David Krapes. After that she studied Muay Thai Kickboxing under the instruction of Bangkok, Thailand Sur Puk & Saekson Janjira of the Muay Thai Academy of America in North Hollywood. Her Muay Thai manager was Felice Levair. She had studied martial arts at Quiet Storm under the instruction of Master Rick Berry, Mr. Brown and her uncle William Groce in Chester, Pennsylvania.

She amassed a kickboxing record of 16-0-1 with 15 KOs. Her only draw came from an exhibition fight with a male opponent. She beat the Most Dangerous Woman in the World from France Valerie Henin in "The Battle of the Masters" PPV show to win the ISKA World Championship in April 1994; this made Gibbs the first African American female to hold the world kickboxing championship for the International Sport Karate Association.

Professional boxing career
In 1997, Gibbs started boxing professionally. Her record was 9-2-1 (2 KO). She made her boxing debut January 23, 1997 in a four-round decision over Maria Fortaleza Recinos. Due to unfortunate scheduling, Gibbs entered the title fight against Leah Mellinger during the time she was filming the movie Knockout. The intense film schedule combined with the cross-country flight from Los Angeles to Atlantic City, New Jersey, was less than ideal, and Gibbs suffered her first loss. Gibbs said the loss to Mellinger inspired her to intensify her training to resume her journey to the top.

On January 15, 1999, Gibbs handed Las Vegas hometown favorite Hannah Fox her first loss in a six-round unanimous decision, shown live on ESPN2. On November 16, 2001, Gibbs fought a highly anticipated WIBA world title fight against Sumya Anani, who had defeated former champion Christy Martin. Gibbs and Anani fought an exciting ten-round majority draw, which left the 140-lb WIBA World Title vacant. The Gibbs-Anani rematch occurred April 28, 2003, and Gibbs was unable to answer the bell for the second round with an injury to her right hand, yielding the victory to Anani. Disappointed in the outcome, Gibbs explained "I came in ready to win this fight, but Sumya is a strong fighter and I was not prepared to fight her with only my left hand." Following the fight, Gibbs announced her retirement from boxing.

Acting and modelling
Gibbs has also worked as an actress and a sports model for Sebastian International Sports Department. She has been featured in Black Achievers, Black Belt, Delco Times, Inside Karate, Jet, Los Angeles Sentinel,  The Philadelphia Inquirer, Sports Illustrated for Women,
and Upscale Magazine.  In 2000, Gibbs played the villain Tanya "Terminator" Tessario in the film Knockout. In 1996, she had a cameo in an episode of "The Fresh Prince of Bel-Air."

Today 

Her fight gear is displayed at the Sports Legend of Delaware County Museum, dedicated to preserving the history and memory of Delaware County Sports Legends. She is an author, celebrity trainer, philanthropist, motivational speaker, and radio host. In 2016–2017 she was honored and participated in the Orange County Heritage Black History Parade and was nominated to attend the United State of Women summit hosted by the White House.

In 2016 Gibbs was named one of the Top Ten Greatest African American Female Athletes of All time for Kickboxing.

Championships and accomplishments 

 1986–1988 3-time World Tae Kwon Do Champion
 1994–2001 ISKA World Kickboxing Champion (2 defenses)
 1995–1999 WKA World Kickboxing Champion (2 defenses)
 1996–2000 WCK World Kickboxing Champion (2 defenses)
 2015–2016 Featured in Orange County Black History Heritage Parade
 2015 Hall of Fame Inductee for Basketball at Chester High School
 2016 AOCA Awakening Outstanding Contribution Award
 2016 Hall of Fame Inductee for Track & Field at Chester High School
 2016 Inducted into Mickey Vernon Sports Legend Museum–Delaware County Black History
 2016 Selected as the Greatest African American Female Athlete of All Time for Kickboxing
 2017 Her ISKA World Championship Belt was Inducted into the Sports Legends Of Delaware County Museum in Radnor, Pa September 17, 2017
 2018 Honored as one of the greatest female athletes in Philadelphia history, held at Temple University in Philadelphia, Pa on August 18, 2018
 2018 Given the Key to the City of her hometown, Chester, Pennsylvania by the Mayor and City of Council, on July 11, 2018

Kickboxing record

|-  style="background:#cfc;"
| 1996-02-03 || Win ||align=left| Tammy Jo Leazier || Muay Thai event || Los Angeles, California, US || TKO  ||  || || 
|-  style="background:#cfc;"
| 1995-08-11 || Win ||align=left| Arlene Sanchez || || Reno, Nevada, US || TKO (retirement) || 5 || || 
|-
! style=background:white colspan=9 |
|-  style="background:#cfc;"
| 1995-?-? || Win ||align=left| Allison Jaeger || || Los Angeles, California, US || TKO (low kicks) || 4 || || 
|-
! style=background:white colspan=9 |
|-  style="background:#cfc;"
| 1994-08-27 || Win ||align=left| Yvonne Trevino || Muay Thai event || Los Angeles, California, US || TKO ||  || || 
|-  style="background:#cfc;"
| 1994-04-15 || Win ||align=left| Valérie Hénin || || San Jose, California, United States || TKO (overhand right)  || 3 || || 
|-
! style=background:white colspan=9 |
|-  style="background:#cfc;"
| 1993-10-03 || Win||align=left| Yvonne Trevino || Muay Thai event || Simi Valley, California, United States || Win || 5 || || 
|-  style="background:#cfc;"
| 1993-07-30 || Win ||align=left| Francine Morris || Muay Thai event || Long Beach, California, United States || Decision (unanimous) || 5 || || 
|-
! style=background:white colspan=9 |
|-  style="background:#cfc;"
| 1993-03-06 || Win ||align=left| Lonnie Shelby||  || Tarzana, California, United States || KO  ||  || || 
|-  style="background:#cfc;"
| 1993-02-06 || Win ||align=left| Chevrette Pabros||  || Bakersfield, California, United States || KO  ||  || || 
|-  style="background:#cfc;"
| 1992-12-12 || Win ||align=left| Christine Dupree|| Muay Thai event || Los Angeles, California, United States ||   ||  || || 
|-  style="background:#cfc;"
| 1992-07-06 || Win ||align=left| Chevrette Pabros||  || Bakersfield, California, United States || KO  ||  || || 
|- 
! style=background:white colspan=9 |
|-  style="background:#cfc;"
| 1992-06-14 || Win ||align=left| Tracey Brown||  || Tarzana, California, United States || KO  ||  || || 
|-  style="background:#cfc;"
| 1992-04-12 || Win ||align=left| Kelley Johns||  || San Bernardino, California, United States || KO  ||  || || 
|-  style="background:#cfc;"
| 1991-10-24 || Win ||align=left| Lois Canelo||  ||  || TKO  ||  || || 
|-
| colspan=9 | Legend:

Professional boxing record

See also
List of female mixed martial artists

References

External links
 Official site
  Meet Ten of the Greatest Black American Female Athletes of All Time
Founder of Philadelphia’s Greatest Women Athletes and Coaches (PGWAC)

1963 births
Living people
African-American boxers
African-American sportswomen
American female kickboxers
Lightweight kickboxers
American female taekwondo practitioners
American Muay Thai practitioners
American women boxers
Boxers from Pennsylvania
Chester High School alumni
Kickboxers from Pennsylvania
Sportspeople from Chester, Pennsylvania
21st-century African-American people
21st-century African-American women
20th-century African-American sportspeople
20th-century African-American women
20th-century African-American people